is a Japanese bilingual reporter and journalist based in Singapore who has worked for the BBC since 2006, when she became the network's first Japanese reporter. As of 2021, she is the Asia Business correspondent.

She began her career with brief stints as an intern at Reuters in New York and an Asia Pacific producer for Bloomberg Television stationed from Tokyo. She moved to Singapore in 2006 when she joined the BBC.

Early life and education
Oi is from the Setagaya ward of Tokyo. Her father works in transport.

She attended the Sacred Heart School in Tokyo and then studied abroad at Presbyterian Ladies' College, Melbourne where she lived with a host family and learned English. Interested in history, she wrote an article in 2013 criticising the Japanese education system for sanitising its imperial history. She began her studies at Keio University before transferring to RMIT University in Australia, graduating with a Bachelor of Communications in Journalism in 2004. She participated in RMITV and interned with the ABC during university.

References

Living people
1981 births
BBC newsreaders and journalists
Japanese expatriates in Singapore
Japanese reporters and correspondents
Japanese television journalists
Japanese women journalists
Japanese women television presenters
Keio University alumni
People educated at the Presbyterian Ladies' College, Melbourne
People from Setagaya
RMIT University alumni
RMITV alumni